Hereworth School is one of only seven independent boys' schools in New Zealand which caters for boarding and day pupils. It was established in 1927 by the amalgamation of Heretaunga School Hastings (New Zealand) and Hurworth School (Wanganui).

The school is founded on five main "cornerstones", which are Academic, Cultural, Christian Dimension, Boarding Life and Sport. The Christian Dimension being very strong at Hereworth, the school has its own chapel and chapel choir in which the whole school attends services four times a week.

Founding 

It was founded in 1927 by H. E. Sturge, with the merger of  Heretaunga School and Hurworth School. Sturge was the headmaster until his death in 1935.

History 

Hereworth was started in 1927 and has since then become a school that ranges from year 0 to year 8. It is one of only seven private boys schools in New Zealand. The schools that it was born from, Hurworth and Heretaunga, were also private schools. Many new facilities have been added to Hereworth School and in 2008 the grounds won the 'Best Garden' award. As of 2007, students and staff have been able to use the modern technology block.

Technology Block 

At the end of the first term in 2007, John Key opened the $2,900,000 Technology Block. In this building there are six rooms. These are used for: Music and Drama, Hard Materials, Media Studies, Computing, Food Technology and Soft Materials (Sewing etc.).

Houses

The boys of Hereworth each belong to one of four houses:

Reeve House
Elder House 
Grant House
Rickard House

Sport

One sport is compulsory in the winter and one in the summer. The winter sports on offer are:

Hockey
Rugby
Soccer

The summer sports on offer are:

Tennis
Softball
Cricket

References

Te Kete Ipurangi
Education Review Office report

Boarding schools in New Zealand
Boys' schools in New Zealand
Educational institutions established in 1927
Intermediate schools in New Zealand
Primary schools in New Zealand
Schools in Hastings, New Zealand
1927 establishments in New Zealand